The Our Lady of Guadalupe Church and Medina Cemetery in Las Animas County, Colorado, at Medina Plaza, was listed on the National Register of Historic Places in 2019.

The church dates from 1866 or 1867 and may be known more commonly as Nuestra Señora de Guadalupe.

It was documented by the Historic American Buildings Survey as "Guadaloupe Mission Church", with photos taken in 1936 by photographer Frederick D. Nichols.  It is recorded as "built 1867" and "adobe with cupola".

Satellite view shows what appears to be a cemetery across the road and up the hill a bit, not visible by Google Streetview.

References

National Register of Historic Places in Las Animas County, Colorado
Mission Revival architecture in Colorado
Roman Catholic churches in Colorado
Cemeteries in Colorado
Roman Catholic churches completed in 1867
19th-century Roman Catholic church buildings in the United States